"Old Man" is a song written and performed by Canadian rock singer-songwriter and guitarist Neil Young from his 1972 album Harvest. "Old Man" was released as a single on Reprise Records in the spring of 1972, reaching number 4 in Canada, and number 31 on the Billboard Hot 100 singles chart for the week ending June 3.

Background
The song was written for the caretaker of the Northern California Broken Arrow Ranch, which Young purchased for $350,000 in 1970 ($2,688,252.58 as of 2022). The song compares a young man's life to an old man's and shows that the young man has, to some extent, the same needs as the old one. James Taylor played six-string banjo (tuned like a guitar) and sang on the song, and Linda Ronstadt also contributed vocals.

In the film Heart of Gold, Young introduces the song as follows:

He tells a similar story when introducing the song at a February 23, 1971 performance broadcast by the BBC (in which he says that he purchased the ranch from "two lawyers").

Uses in popular culture and covers
 In 2005, Lizz Wright covered it on her live album Dreaming Wide Awake, recorded at Allaire, Shokan, New York the year before. It also appears in the film Lords of Dogtown.
 In 2008, during the memorial service for Heath Ledger, the song was chosen to be played with a slideshow of pictures from Ledger's life.
 Liam Finn (Neil Finn's son) & EJ Barnes (Jimmy Barnes's daughter) covered the song on the TV show RocKwiz.
 In 2011, Dallas Green, of City and Colour and Alexisonfire, covered the song at The 2011 Juno Awards, and post-grunge band Puddle of Mudd covered it on their covers album Re:(disc)overed. That same year Redlight King sampled "Old Man" on the album Something for the Pain. It was the first time Young had sanctioned a sample of this song.
 In 2015, Young appeared on The Tonight Show Starring Jimmy Fallon and performed the song with Fallon as his Neil Young character.
 In 2022, Beck covered Old Man to promote a Sunday Night Football match between the Tampa Bay Buccaneers and the Kansas City Chiefs. The song is a nod to quarterback Tom Brady, the oldest active player in the NFL (in 2022) at 45 years old. The line “24 and there’s so much more” refers to Brady and Kansas City quarterback Patrick Mahomes winning Super Bowls when they were 24 years old. After the commercial was released Neil Young posted a still image from the video for his 1988 anti-commercialization song This Note's for You in apparent protest of Beck's cover of Old Man being used in a commercial. Beck's cover was nominated for Best Rock Performance for the 65th Grammy Awards later that year.

Charts

Personnel
 Neil Young — guitars, lead vocals
 Ben Keith — pedal steel guitar
 James McMahon — piano
 James Taylor — banjo guitar, backing vocals
 Linda Ronstadt — backing vocals
 Tim Drummond — bass
 Kenny Buttrey — drums

References

1972 songs
1972 singles
Neil Young songs
Reprise Records singles
Songs written by Neil Young
Song recordings produced by Elliot Mazer
Songs about old age
Song recordings produced by Neil Young